John Hendrick is an American college football coach and former professional player.  He is the former head football coach at Jackson State University in Jackson, Mississippi, a position he had assumed midway through the 2018 season and maintained throughout the 2019 season.  Hendrick served as the head football coach at Benedict College in Columbia, South Carolina from 2003 to 2006.

Hendrick was a four-year letter winner at the University of Pittsburgh from 1978 to 1981 as a defensive lineman under head coach Jackie Sherrill, where he was a teammate of quarterback Dan Marino.

Head coaching record

Notes

References

Year of birth missing (living people)
Living people
American football defensive linemen
Alabama State Hornets football coaches
Arkansas–Pine Bluff Golden Lions football coaches
Benedict Tigers football coaches
Delaware State Hornets football coaches
Jackson State Tigers football coaches
Kansas State Wildcats football coaches
LSU Tigers football coaches
Mississippi State Bulldogs football coaches
Pittsburgh Panthers football players
South Carolina State Bulldogs football coaches
South Florida Bulls football coaches
Southern Jaguars football coaches
Temple Owls football coaches
Texas A&M Aggies football coaches
Tulane Green Wave football coaches
African-American coaches of American football
African-American players of American football
20th-century African-American sportspeople
21st-century African-American sportspeople